Lacunisphaera parvula  is a Gram-negative and aerobic bacterium from the genus of Lacunisphaera which has been isolated from a freshwater lake.

References

 

Verrucomicrobiota
Bacteria described in 2017